Progressive rock (sometimes known as underground rock) is a radio station programming format that emerged in the late 1960s, in which disc jockeys are given wide latitude in what they may play, similar to the freeform format but with the proviso that some kind of rock music is almost always played.  It enjoyed the height of its popularity in the late 1960s and 1970s.  The name for the format began being used circa 1968, when serious disc jockeys were playing "progressive 'music for the head and discussing social issues in between records.  During the late 1960s, as long-playing records began to supplant the single in popularity with rock audiences, progressive rock stations placed more emphasis on album tracks than did their AM counterparts.  Throughout the 1970s, as FM stations moved to more structured formats, progressive rock evolved into album-oriented rock (AOR).

Origins
When FM broadcasting licenses were first issued by the FCC, broadcasters were slow to take advantage of the new airwaves available to them because their advertising revenues were generated primarily from existing AM broadcasting stations and because there were few FM radio receivers owned by the general public. This void created an opportunity for the disenchanted youth counterculture of the 1960s to express itself by playing music that was largely ignored by mainstream outlets. In this sense, progressive rock radio was more of a social response than a product marketed to fill a need.  

This change coincided with the greater emphasis on albums as opposed to singles in the rock market. Hugely popular albums such as The Beatles' Sgt. Pepper's Lonely Hearts Club Band and Arlo Guthrie's Alice's Restaurant did not contain any singles, so there was clearly a need for a radio format that would explore beyond the Top 40.  This in turn led to rock artists placing greater emphasis on long or experimental album tracks, knowing they could still receive radio airplay.

Definition
The progressive rock radio format should not be confused with the progressive rock music genre.  While progressive rock music was certainly played on progressive rock radio stations, a number of other varieties of rock music were also played.  Generally everything from early Beatles and early Dylan on forward was fair game.  Progressive rock radio was generally the only outlet for fringe rock genres such as space rock, jazz fusion, and quiet, acoustic-based folk rock and country rock (often played on weekend mornings).  Progressive stations were also known for having "turntable hits", songs by obscure artists that did not sell much and were not hits by any conventional measure, but which listeners kept calling up and requesting; Sweet Thursday's "Gilbert Street" was a good example on the East Coast.  

The progressive rock radio format grew out of the freeform radio format, and, sharing the key characteristic of disc jockeys having the freedom to play what they chose, has sometimes been referred to as "freeform rock radio" or "freeform progressive radio" or simply "FM rock radio".  But as they evolved there were key differences between the freeform and progressive rock formats:
 Freeform could play any genre of music; progressive rock generally limited itself to (various kinds of) rock.
 After its early days, freeform tended towards small or "underground" stations in non-commercial or niche markets; progressive rock could and did handle big-signal stations in large markets.
 Progressive rock was intended to be as fully commercially viable as any other mainstream radio format; freeform usually shunned such ambitions.
 The progressive rock format had a large impact on the commercial rock music industry at the time; the freeform format generally did not.

Stations and personnel

The archetypal successful and influential progressive rock radio station was WNEW-FM in New York in the late 1960s, 1970s, and into the 1980s.  For instance,  Keith Emerson credited it for breaking Emerson, Lake & Palmer into the United States market.  Other long-running, large-market examples included WMMR in Philadelphia (credited with helping to break Bruce Springsteen), WBCN in Boston, WHFS in Washington, D.C., WXRT in Chicago, WMMS in Cleveland, WEBN in Cincinnati, CJOM, WWWW and WABX in Detroit/Windsor, WZMF in Milwaukee, KQRS-FM in Minneapolis, WOWI in Norfolk, WORJ-FM in Orlando, KSHE in St. Louis, KDKB in Phoenix, KMET in Los Angeles, KSAN in San Francisco, KZAP and KSFM (102.5) in Sacramento, KZEW in Dallas, and KTIM in San Rafael. Many of the higher-profile stations among these were owned by Metromedia. College progressive rock radio stations included WVBR in Ithaca, New York, WKNC in Raleigh, North Carolina, WBRU in Providence, Rhode Island, WRPI in Troy, New York, and WWUH in Hartford, Connecticut.  

Pioneering progressive rock radio disc jockey and program directors included Scott Muni in New York, Lee Arnold in Orlando, and Tom Donahue in San Francisco.

Later developments

Over time (some much faster than others), the large-city progressive rock stations usually lost DJ freedom and adopted the more structured and confined album-oriented rock (AOR) format in the late 1970s and 1980s, and then later the nostalgic classic rock format in the 1980s and 1990s, while the smaller stations sometimes turned to college rock or alternative rock.  Where once "progressive
rock radio [was] the key media of ascendant rock culture", as writer Nelson George put it, by 1987, musician and author Robert Palmer would write, "The glory days of 'progressive' rock radio - when the disk jockey actually chose the records he played and creatively juxtaposed songs and styles - are long gone." 

While freeform stations are still around in the 2000s, such as New Jersey's WFMU, and for a while  95.7 the Ride in Charlotte, North Carolina, recalled the format's original sound, there may be no real examples of the specific progressive rock radio format in existence today on the FM dial.  The closest thing to a progressive rock station may be the Deep Tracks channel on Sirius XM Satellite Radio, which plays some of the music originally heard on progressive rock radio, but without pronounced disc jockey personalities or the full feel of the original format. "Stuck in the Psychedelic Era," a syndicated program heard on some non-commercial stations, recreates the format, but rarely includes any recordings made after 1970. Some of the spirit of progressive rock radio (albeit in a more mellow, "adult" form) can also be found in the adult album alternative format.

References

Radio formats
Rock radio formats